Alice Grey may refer to:
Alice Grey (alleged witch) (died 1612), one of the Pendle witches
Alice Grey, Countess Grey (died 1944), wife of Albert Grey, 4th Earl Grey

See also
Alice Gray (1914 – 1994), American entomologist and origamist
Alice Gray (science blogger) (born 1992), Welsh science writer